The 2000–01 League of Wales was the ninth season of the League of Wales since its establishment in 1992. It began on 18 August 2000 and ended on 5 May 2001. The league was won by Barry Town, their fifth title.

League table

Results

References

Cymru Premier seasons
1
Wales